Łeba (pronounced: ,) is a seaside town in the Pomeranian Voivodeship of northern Poland. It is located in the region of Gdańsk Pomerania (Pomerelia), near Łebsko Lake and the mouth of the river Łeba on the Slovincian Coast of the Baltic Sea.

History

The Pomerelian settlement of Łeba was first mentioned in a 1282 document of Mestwin II, Duke of Pomerania. At that time the village was located about two kilometers west from the present mouth of the Łeba River. The church of St. Nicholas was mentioned in 1296. Łeba was part of fragmented Poland until 1309, when it was annexed by the Teutonic Order after their takeover of Gdańsk. Łeba received municipal rights by the State of the Teutonic Order in 1357. Located at the Łebsko Lake at the Baltic Sea, it developed to a fishing port and a wood marketplace.

In 1440, the town joined the Prussian Confederation, which opposed Teutonic rule, and upon the request of which King Casimir IV Jagiellon reincorporated the territory to the Kingdom of Poland in 1454. With Lauenburg (Lębork) Land it became a Polish fief during the Thirteen Years' War in 1455, held by the Dukes of Pomerania.

Old Łeba was threatened for many centuries by floods and expanding sand dunes and therefore was rebuilt in a safer location after 1558. The town was reintegrated with the Polish Crown after the death of the last Pomeranian duke Bogislaw XIV as part of the Pomeranian Voivodeship, until King John II Casimir Vasa enfeoffed Elector Frederick William I of Brandenburg-Prussia with Lauenburg Land by the 1657 Treaty of Bydgoszcz.

With the First Partition of Poland in 1772, Łeba was incorporated into Prussia. Soon after a large port was built on instruction of the Prussian king, whereby a  broad channel between the Leba lake and the Baltic Sea was dug, which however did not weather the storms on the coast. Due to its picturesque setting, the Leba seaside after World War I became a popular resort for German bohémiens. The painter Max Pechstein and other expressionists frequented the place.

In the proximity of Leba there is a large former testing area for long-range rocket weapons operated by the Rheinmetall company. On the Leba spit the German long-range rocket Rheinbote was tested between 1941 and 1945. Also the V-1 flying bomb was tested here from 1943 to 1945. Between 1963 and 1973 33 Meteor sounding rockets were launched from Łeba.

In March 1945, shortly before the end of World War II, the region was occupied by the Red Army. Following the Potsdam Conference, after the end of the war the town became again part of Poland.

Sights

Further objects of interest include:
ruins of the St. Nicholas church west of the city on the way to the beach
fishermen's church of 1683 with a painting by Max Pechstein
fishermen's dwellings from the 19th century in Kościuszki street
the 19th century casino on Nadmorska street, today the Hotel Neptun
former rocket test site near Pletka
the dinosaur park south of the city

Climate
Łeba has an oceanic climate  (Köppen climate classification: Cfb).

Demographics
Since the medieval Christianization of the region, the local population was Catholic. After the Reformation, the inhabitants of the town were predominantly Protestants and the area was subjected to Germanisation. Since the end of World War II the population is predominantly composed of Polish Roman Catholics.

See also
Łeba (PKP station)
Slovincians

Famous people
 Klaus Weiher, a noble of the Weyher family 
 Martin Weiher (1512–1556) (de) Lutheran bishop of Cammin

International relations

Łeba is twinned with:

References

External links

Main website
Łeba accommodation
Photogallery

Cities and towns in Pomeranian Voivodeship
Coastal cities and towns in Poland
Lębork County
Seaside resorts in Poland